Metalux is an American noise band consisting of M.V. Carbon and J. Graf, both members of Bride of No No. They are occasionally joined by Nautical Almanac member Twig Harper. Early material was released on the Hanson Records label, while their Waiting for Armadillo album was released on Load Records in 2004.

Discography
This discography is incomplete

Solo
Negative Capacity CD-R (Blackhole Records, 1998)
Metalux III cdr (Hanson Records, 2000)
Fluorescent Towers LP/CD (Hanson Records, 2001)
Waiting for Armadillo LP/CD (Load Records, 2004)
Victim of Space LP/CD (5RC, 2005)
split lp with Evil Moisture (Veglia, 2005)
1-0-0-3/1-0-0-2 Cool Nite cassette/CD-R (Bennifer Editions/self-released, 2009)
split lp with K.K. Rampage (Rampage Recordings, 2009)
Paw The Elated Ruin CD-R/cassette (self-released/Obsolete Units, 2011/2013)

Collaborations
Metalux & John Wiese Exoteric CD (Load Records, 2007)
Smegma/Carlos Giffoni/Metalux untitled LP (Los Angeles Free Music Society/No Fun Productions, 2007)

Compilations
Winter Construction CD with zine (Dead CEO, 2002)
Pilot Conference CD with zine (Pilot TV, 2004) - Distributed with a zine for Pilot Television Convergence: Experimental Media for Feminist Trespass that happened in Chicago, October 8–11, 2004
Sur La Mer Samp-La-Mer CD (5RC, 2006)

External links
www.metalux.cc official site
Load Records Metalux profile.

Media
Metalux Photo Gallery Photos by Lars
PUNKCAST#1224 live video @ Cake Shop NYC on Nov 9 2007. (RealPlayer, mp4, DivX)

American noise rock music groups
Electronic music duos
Load Records artists